Sportschau is a German sports magazine on broadcaster ARD, produced by WDR in Cologne. The magazine started in 1961. In its Saturday' edition, the Sportschau shows a summary of the Bundesliga, whereas the Sunday edition reports on the latest events from various sports. Sportschau is aired on Das Erste and the regional stations.

Since 2008, Sportschau begins at 6pm. As there is a contractual agreement that the Bundesliga may only be shown from 18:30, the program reports about the second and third leagues in the first half-hour.

Since January 2011, the free Sportschau-App is obtainable for iOS and Android, whereby sport news and a live ticker are available for mobile devices.

Special broadcast
The ARD and the second public TV broadcaster ZDF show football matches of the Germany national team, DFB-Pokal as well as the FIFA World Cup, the UEFA European Championship, the DTM, wintersports and the Olympic Games in a special edition called Sportschau live.

See also
11 Freunde

References

External links

ARD (broadcaster)
German sports television series
1961 German television series debuts
1960s German television series
1970s German television series
1980s German television series
1990s German television series
2000s German television series
2010s German television series
German-language television shows
Das Erste original programming
Football mass media in Germany